Increment or incremental may refer to:
Incrementalism, a theory (also used in politics as a synonym for gradualism)
Increment and decrement operators, the operators ++ and -- in computer programming
Incremental computing
Incremental backup, which contain only that portion that has changed since the preceding backup copy.
Increment, chess term for additional time a chess player receives on each move
Incremental games
Increment in rounding

See also

1+1 (disambiguation)

da:Inkrementel
fr:Incrémentation
nl:Increment
ja:インクリメント
pl:Inkrementacja
ru:Инкремент
sr:Инкремент
sv:++